Thomas Fowler may refer to:

 Tom Fowler (cartoonist), Canadian comics artist
 Tom Fowler (musician) (born 1951), American bass guitarist
 Thomas Fowler (courtier) (died 1590), political agent in Scotland
 Thomas Fowler (1735–1801), English physician who proposed in 1786 the Fowler's solution
 Thomas Fowler (inventor) (1777–1843), English inventor
 Tom Fowler (ice hockey) (1924–1994), Canadian ice hockey centreman
 Thomas Fowler (politician), member of the California State Senate and namesake of Fowler, California
 Thomas Fowler (academic) (1832–1904), Vice-Chancellor of the University of Oxford, 1899–1901
 Thomas W. Fowler (1921–1944), U.S. Army officer and Medal of Honor recipient
Thomas Fowler (cricketer), English cricketer and solicitor
 Thomas Fowler (MP) for Wycombe (UK Parliament constituency)